Carlo De Notaris (Milan, 1812 - Milan, 1888) was an Italian painter, active in a Neoclassic style.

Biography
He was a pupil of Carlo Bellosio and Francesco Hayez. His fellow students under Bellosio included Domenico Biraghi, Pedroli Carlo, Francioli Enrico, Carlo Corti, and Baldassare Verazzi.

A portrait of the artist by his master Hayez can be seen at the Brera Academy. His son, Stefano De Notaris, was a writer.

References

External links

1812 births
1888 deaths
19th-century Italian painters
Italian male painters
Painters from Milan
Italian neoclassical painters
19th-century Italian male artists